Jørgen Cappelen (born 2 February 1959) is a Norwegian rower. He competed in the men's coxed four event at the 1972 Summer Olympics.

References

1959 births
Living people
Norwegian male rowers
Olympic rowers of Norway
Rowers at the 1972 Summer Olympics
Rowers from Oslo